John Nance may refer:

Jack Nance, actor
John J. Nance, pilot and author